Arbor Mist is the brand name of an alcoholic beverage which blends wines such as Merlot, Zinfandel and Chardonnay with fruit flavourings and high fructose corn syrup. Its slogan is "Great Tasting Wine with a Splash of Fruit."  Arbor Mist has a lower alcohol content than most wines, and is usually cheaper than other similar alcoholic beverages. It is made by the Arbor Mist Winery in Canandaigua, New York, and is packaged by E&J Gallo Winery.

Varieties
Arbor Mist first appeared on store shelves in the United States in the summer of 1998, and was the best-selling wine debut since the 1970s.  Originally appearing in just two different fruit varieties, Arbor Mist now makes fourteen standard varieties of their wine product:

Blackberry Merlot
Cherry Red Moscato
Cranberry Twist White Merlot
Exotic Fruits White Zinfandel
Island Fruits Pinot Grigio
Mango Strawberry Moscato
Peach Chardonnay
Peach Moscato
Pineapple Strawberry Pink Moscato
Pomegranate Berry Pinot Noir 
Raspberry Pink Moscato
Sangria Zinfandel
Strawberry White Zinfandel
Tropical Fruit Chardonnay
White Pear Pinot Grigio

Arbor Mist also makes a seasonal, winter flavor:

Winter Berry Merlot (also sold under a number of different names, such as Merry Berry Merlot)

Discontinued flavours include:

Melon White Zinfandel
Mixed Berry Pinot Noir
Orchard Fruits Chardonnay

In 2009 Arbor Mist launched two new champagne-like products:

Peach Sparkle
Raspberry Sparkle

In addition, Arbor Mist has started producing margaritas:

Pineapple Coconut Margarita
Strawberry Margarita

Arbor Mist also manufactures "wine blenders" as well.

References

External links
Official website

Alcoholic drink brands
New York (state) wine